Michael Magnus Thyne Henderson (1942 - April 2, 2018) was an American linguist and Professor of Linguistics at the University of Kansas. He is best known for his works on Dari Persian. 
He was an executive director of the Kabul English Language Center in Afghanistan (1965-1968).

References

External links
Henderson

1942 births
2018 deaths
University of Kansas faculty
University of Wisconsin–Madison alumni
American phonologists
Linguists from the United States
Linguists from the United Kingdom
Grammarians of Persian
Dialectologists